Frasier is an American television sitcom created by David Angell, Peter Casey, and David Lee as a spinoff of the 1980s sitcom Cheers. The series revolves around the titular character Frasier Crane, a psychiatrist who returns to his hometown to start a new life for himself. The series stars Kelsey Grammer in role of the main character, as well as Jane Leeves, David Hyde Pierce, Peri Gilpin and John Mahoney.

Frasier aired on NBC from September 16, 1993 to May 13, 2004, broadcasting 264 episodes over eleven seasons during its initial run. During the series' run, the show received critical acclaim for its writing and humor. The series amassed 318 nominations for a variety of industry awards, including 108 Emmy awards (with 37 wins), 24 Golden Globe Awards (with two wins), 26 Screen Actors Guild Awards (with 2 wins), 11 TCA Awards (with five wins), 9 Writers Guild of America awards (with six wins), and 9 Directors Guild of America awards (with two wins).

In addition to the awards for the series, several individual cast members received acclaim for their performance on the series. Pierce stands as the most decorated cast member on the series, winning 4 Emmy awards, 5 Q Awards, 2 TCA awards, 2 SAG awards and 6 American Comedy awards. Grammer also won 4 Emmy Awards, 4 Q awards, 2 Golden Globes, 2 Satellite awards, 2 American Comedy Awards and a SAG award. Several other actors and crew members in the series received many awards and nominations, including Leeves, Mahoney, and the creators of the show.

Awards and nominations

ACE Eddie Awards
Receiving seven nominations for an Eddie Award, Frasier won three awards for Best Edited Half Hour Series for Television, all received by television series editor Ron Volk.

American Comedy Awards
Frasier received twenty award nominations for an American Comedy Awards during its tenure. The series won nine—six awards for Funniest Supporting Male Performer in a TV Series awarded to David Hyde Pierce, two for Funniest Male Performer in a TV Series (Leading Role) Network, Cable or Syndication awarded to Kelsey Grammer, and an award for Funniest Television Series.

Artios Awards
Frasier received eleven consecutive nominations for Best Casting for TV, Comedy Episodic, one for every season the series was on television, winning five times. The series was also nominated for Best Casting for TV, Pilot.

BMI Film & TV Awards
Frasier was recognized eleven times at the BMI Film & TV Awards, with Darryl Phinnessee winning eleven awards and Bruce Miller winning seven.

Directors Guild of America Awards
Presented by the Directors Guild of America since 1938, The Directors Guild of America Award honors excellence in the field of direction. Frasier received nine nominations for the award for Outstanding Directorial Achievement in Comedy Series, three out of nine for work by Pamela Fryman and two of them by David Lee. James Burrows won the award in 1994 while Lee won it in following year.

Emmy Awards

Frasier received 108 Primetime Emmy Award nominations, with 37 wins. It passed The Mary Tyler Moore Show in 2002 to set the record for the most wins for a scripted series, a record it would hold until being surpassed by Game of Thrones in 2016. The series received eight nominations for the award for Outstanding Comedy Series and won the category a record-breaking five times from 1994 to 1998. Kelsey Grammer won the award for Outstanding Lead Actor in a Comedy Series four times in 1994, 1995, 1998 and 2004. The series received thirteen nominations for Outstanding Supporting Actor in a Comedy Series, with David Hyde Pierce winning the award four times in 1995, 1998, 1999 and 2004. John Mahoney was nominated twice in 1999 and 2003. Frasier also received a number of nominations for guest performances, including several Cheers alumni. Among the winners were Jean Smart, who won the award for Outstanding Guest Actress in a Comedy Series twice, Laura Linney, who won in 2004 for her portrayal of Charlotte Connor, Derek Jacobi, who won the award for Outstanding Guest Actor in a Comedy Series, and Anthony LaPaglia, winning in 2002, and received two nominations for Outstanding Guest Actor in a Comedy Series. The series received 36 nominations for Creative Arts Emmy Awards. Television editor Ron Volk won eight awards for Outstanding Multi-Camera Picture Editing for a Series. Dana Mark McClure, Thomas J. Huth and Robert Douglass won two awards for Outstanding Multi-Camera Sound Mixing for a Series or a Special.

Primetime Emmy Awards

Creative Arts Emmy Awards

Golden Globe Awards

Frasier received 24 Golden Globe Award nominations during its tenure, with two wins for Best Actor – Television Series Musical or Comedy for Kelsey Grammer.

Humanitas Prize

Awarded since 1974, the Humanitas Prize is an annual accolade that recognizes outstanding achievement of writers in film and television whose work promotes human dignity, meaning and freedom. Frasier received 6 nominations of for the award for 30 Minute Network or Syndicated Television, winning twice times in 1996 and 2000.

Q Awards

The Q Award, presented by the Viewers for Quality Television, honors programs and performers that the organization deem are of the highest quality. Out of 32 nominations, Frasier won thirteen awards, including Best Quality Comedy Series three times from 1995 to 1997; Best Actor in a Quality Comedy Series for Kelsey Grammer four times from 1995 to 1998; Best Supporting Actor in a Comedy Series for David Hyde Pierce six times from 1993 to 1998 and 2000; and Best Supporting Actress in a Comedy Series for Jane Leeves in 1995.

Satellite Awards
During its tenure, Frasier received fourteen award nominations for a Satellite Award, winning three awards—winning one for Best Television Series – Musical or Comedy while Kelsey Grammer won two for Best Actor – Television Series Musical or Comedy.

Screen Actors Guild Awards
Frasier received 26 Screen Actors Guild Award nominations, eight for Outstanding Performance by a Male Actor in a Comedy Series for Kelsey Grammer and David Hyde Pierce each and ten for Outstanding Performance by an Ensemble in a Comedy Series for the cast. Pierce won the award in 1996 while the cast won the ensemble award in 2000.

Television Critics Association Awards

During its tenure, Frasier received eleven TCA Award nominations, winning five. Three wins were for Outstanding Achievement in Comedy while two were for Individual Achievement in Comedy, awarded to David Hyde Pierce.

TV Guide Awards
Frasier received ten award nominations for a TV Guide Award, winning three awards.

TV Land Awards
The TV Land Award is an award presented at the eponymous award ceremony, airing on TV Land, that honors television programs that are off air. Frasier received three nominations.

Writers Guild of America Awards

Presented by the Writers Guild of America (WGA), the Writers Guild of America Award is an annual accolade that recognizes outstanding achievement of writers in film, television, radio, promotional writing, and video games. Frasier received 9 nominations of for the award for Television: Episodic Comedy, winning six times.

Other awards
Frasier was also the recipient of a Peabody Award in 1994, with the award committee praising it as "an uncommonly good comedy of manners and mores in contemporary times" and for delving "into sensitive issues with inventive writing, exceptional characterization and unusual insight." The series also won two People's Choice Awards in 1994 and 1999 and a Producers Guild of America Award for Best Episodic Television in 1995. The series also received nominations for two NAACP Image Awards, an Angel Award, ADG Excellence in Production Design Awards, and Young Artist Award.

Notes

Nominees for awards

Other

References

External links
 List of Primetime Emmy Awards received by Frasier
 List of awards and nominations received by Frasier at IMDb

Frasier
Frasier